Wyldecrest Parks  is a mobile home park company in the United Kingdom, operating about 97 parks including seven holiday parks.

In June 2021, Wyldecrest was fined £100,000 and ordered to pay a further £11,000 in legal fees after it was found by Oxford Magistrates Court to have breached two planning enforcement notices. The company had previously been ordered to remove improvements to a green belt site at Bayworth Mobile Home Park, near Abingdon-on-Thames, which only had permission to be used as a car park.

In August 2022, Alfie Best, chairman Wyldecrest Parks started a petition to enable all Residential Park Home residents should be eligible for £400 electricity grant. The petition reached more than 12,000 signatures. On 29 July the Government announced a new provision to deliver equivalent support this winter for energy bills to residents of park homes and other households which will not benefit from the Energy Bills Support Scheme discount. An announcement with details on how and when these households across Great Britain can access this support will be made this Autumn.

History
The company was founded in 1991 with the purchase of Lakeview Park in Romford, Essex by its present chairman Alfie Best. It was originally based in Rainham, Essex but later moved its headquarters to West Thurrock, Essex. Wyldecrest Park is a residential mobile home park brand, and Wyldecrest Holiday Park is a sub- brand which focuses on the holiday parks including a golf course.

The company operates a charity called the Wyldecrest Charitable Trust.

In October 2011, Wyldecrest Parks owner Alfie Best, voluntarily accepted a police caution for an alleged physical assault on one of his residents at Scatterdells Park, Bovingdon. The resident was protesting alterations to the park. She later pressed charges, with police offering Best either a caution or go to court.

In December 2018, Wyldecrest Parks was ordered by Havering Council to demolish dwellings which they had built at the Lakeview Park property near Romford after it was revealed that the development was on greenbelt land and lacked planning permission as it was outside of the park's licensed area. Some residents had paid up to £280,000.

In March 2019, Wyldecrest Parks was shortlisted as a finalist for the RESI 2019 awards, in the category of "Retirement Living Operator of the Year".

In 2019, Wyldecrest Parks was awarded Leading Residential & Holiday Park Operator 2019 - UK by Global Business Insight Awards.

Wyldecrest Parks has recently acquired Tranquility Park in Woolacombe.

In February 2021, Private Eye reported that Wyldecrest Parks had lost a third appeal in a legal battle with a 77 year old resident over inflated site charges for electricity where it was claimed that the company was charging over three times the average daily domestic tariff.

References

External links
Wyldecrest Parks
Wyldecrest Holiday Park

Companies based in Essex
Portable buildings and shelters